This article shows the rosters of all participating teams at the 2017 Asian Women's Club Volleyball Championship in Ust-Kamenogorsk, Kazakhstan.

Pool A

Altay
The following is the roster of the Kazakhstani club Altay in the 2017 Asian Club Championship.

Head coach:  Yaroslav Antonov

Supreme Chonburi
The following is the roster of the Thai club  Supreme Chonburi in the 2017 Asian Club Championship.

Head coach:  Nataphon Srisamutnak

Sarmayeh Bank
The following is the roster of the Iranian club Sarmayeh Bank Tehran in the 2017 Asian Club Championship.

Head coach:  Mitra Shabanian

Taiwan Power
The following is the roster of the Taiwanese club Taiwan Power in the 2017 Asian Club Championship.

Head coach:  Yao Cheng-shan

Pool B

Hisamitsu Springs

The following is the roster of the Japanese club Hisamitsu Springs in the 2017 Asian Club Championship.

Head coach:   Shingo Sakai

Tianjin Bohai Bank
The following is the roster of the Chinese club Tianjin Bohai Bank in the 2017 Asian Club Championship.

Head coach:  Wang Bao-quan

Vietinbank VC
The following is the roster of the Vietnamese club Vietinbank in the 2017 Asian Club Championship.

Head coach:  Lê Văn Dũng

Rebisco-PSL
The following is the roster of the Filipino club Rebisco-PSL in the 2017 Asian Club Championship.

Head coach:  Francis Vicente

References

External links
2016 AVC Asian Women’s Club Championship Teams - Philippine SuperLiga

Asian Women's Club Volleyball Championship squads
2017 in Kazakhstani sport
2017 in women's volleyball